Mindy Lee Sterling (born July 11, 1953) is an American television, film and voice actress. She portrayed Frau Farbissina in the Austin Powers film series and starred in the web series Con Man, the latter of which earned her a Primetime Emmy Award nomination. She has had recurring roles as Miss Francine Briggs on the Nickelodeon series iCarly, Principal Susan Skidmore on the Disney Channel series A.N.T. Farm, and Linda Schwartz on the ABC series The Goldbergs.

Sterling has also done voiceover work for animation. For Cartoon Network, she provided the voice of Ms. Endive in the series Chowder. For Nickelodeon, she voiced Lin Beifong in The Legend of Korra (2012–2014) and Morgana in the Nickelodeon version of Winx Club.

Early life
Sterling was born in Paterson, New Jersey on July 11, 1953. Her father Dick Sterling was an actor and nightclub comedian and her mother Florence Adele “Bookie” Sterling (née Pushkin)  was a dancer. She has one brother, Mark Sterling. She is Jewish.

Career
Around 1973, Sterling landed a recurring role on the syndicated children's series Dusty's Treehouse. She later joined the L.A.-based comedy troupe The Groundlings. Despite having starred in numerous films in the 1980s and 1990s, it was her character Frau Farbissina, the diminutive and domineering Germanic cohort of Dr. Evil (Mike Myers) in Austin Powers: International Man of Mystery, that brought Sterling high praise for her work in films.

From 1990 to 1991, she was one of the comedians in the satirical show On the Television. Sterling plays Christian Slater's secretary Arlene Scott in the show My Own Worst Enemy. She also played Judge Foodie on the Disney show That's So Raven and a volleyball coach on The Suite Life of Zack & Cody. She appeared as the wedding planner on the Friends episode "The One with Barry and Mindy's Wedding" in 1996, and in 2004, as the casting director on the episode "Joey and the Big Audition" of Joey. In 1999, following the success of Austin Powers: The Spy Who Shagged Me, Sterling appeared in Drop Dead Gorgeous (also 1999), and later reprised  the character Frau Farbissina in Austin Powers in Goldmember for the third and final time. In 2000, Sterling appeared as a celebrity guest on Hollywood Squares. She returned to the show in 2002. She played one of the townspeople in the live-action adaptation of How the Grinch Stole Christmas, and also provided additional voices in the 2018 CGI version, The Grinch. Between 2002 and 2004, Sterling made guest appearances on the Donny Osmond version of the game show Pyramid.

From 2007 to 2010, Sterling voiced Ms. Endive, the main antagonist to Mung Daal in Chowder. She voiced the character Lin Beifong, the second Police Chief of Republic City and daughter of original chief Toph Beifong, in The Legend of Korra. She also had a recurring voice role as Morgana on the Nickelodeon version of Winx Club in 2012. Her many other voice-over credits include guest roles on The Wild Thornberrys, Invader Zim, Ice Age: The Meltdown, American Dragon: Jake Long, Higglytown Heroes, Robot Chicken, Mars Needs Moms, The Looney Tunes Show, Justice League Unlimited, Kick Buttowski: Suburban Daredevil and Scooby-Doo! Mystery Incorporated.

Sterling has achieved success in teen sitcoms, playing Ms. Francine Briggs on iCarly, and in A.N.T. Farm as Principal Susan Skidmore. On April 25, 2013 before the finale of the second season of A.N.T. Farm, Sterling announced she would not be appearing on the show's third season due to family obligations. She announced in June 2012 that she may return in the fourth season, with guest appearances in season three. In 2010, she had a recurring role as bitter neighbour Mitzi Kinsky in Desperate Housewives. In 2012, she appeared in a book trailer for a parody of The Hunger Games entitled The Hunger Pains. In 2013, she starred as Janice Nugent in the comedy series Legit. In 2018, she appeared in Netflix's A Series of Unfortunate Events. She currently appears on the sitcom The Goldbergs as the mother of Geoff Schwartz.

Personal life
Sterling has a son from her previous marriage to Brian Gadson.

In 1998, Sterling was diagnosed with breast cancer after a routine mammogram. After a lumpectomy, chemotherapy, radiation treatment and tamoxifen, she has remained cancer-free.

Filmography

Film

Television

Video games

References

External links

 

1953 births
Living people
Actresses from New Jersey
Actors from Paterson, New Jersey
American film actresses
American television actresses
American voice actresses
20th-century American actresses
21st-century American actresses
Jewish American actresses